Phragmacossia minos is a species of moth of the family Cossidae. It is found on Crete.

References

Moths described in 1962
Zeuzerinae
Moths of Europe